Roodevälja is a village in Sõmeru Parish, Lääne-Viru County, in northeastern Estonia. It is located just northeast of the town of Rakvere. Roodevälja has a population of 153 (as of 1 January 2010).

Rakvere Meat Processing Plant (Rakvere Lihakombinaat), the biggest meat products manufacturer in the Baltic states, is located in Roodevälja.

References

Villages in Lääne-Viru County